The pale white-eye also known as Kenya white-eye (Zosterops flavilateralis) is a bird species in the family Zosteropidae. It is found in central and eastern Kenya and in eastern Tanzania.

The pale white-eye was formerly treated as a subspecies of the Abyssinian white-eye (Zosterops abyssinicus) but is now treated as a separate species.

References

pale white-eye
Fauna of Kenya
Fauna of Tanzania
pale white-eye